Kermia geraldsmithi is a species of sea snail, a marine gastropod mollusk in the family Raphitomidae.

Description
The length of the shell varies between 4 mm and 6 mm.

Distribution
This marine species occurs off KwaZulu-Natal, South Africa

References

External links
 Kilburn, R. N. (2009). Genus Kermia (Mollusca: Gastropoda: Conoidea: Conidae: Raphitominae) in South African Waters, with Observations on the Identities of Related Extralimital Species. African Invertebrates. 50(2): 217-236
 Gastropods.com: Kermia geraldsmithi

Endemic fauna of South Africa
geraldsmithi
Gastropods described in 2009